Robert Richards (7 May 1884 – 22 December 1954) was a British Labour Party politician, who served as Member of Parliament (MP) for Wrexham in North Wales for three periods between 1922 and 1954.

He was born at Tanyffordd, Llangynog, Montgomeryshire, the son of John Richards, mineworker, and started at Llangynog Primary Council School on 6 May 1889. He then attended the County School at Llanfyllin, Montgomeryshire at the same time as Clement Davies, later Member of Parliament for Montgomeryshire for the Liberal Party for many years. From there Richards went on to study at University College of Wales, Aberystwyth and St John's College, Cambridge, where he read the Economics Tripos and received an upper second-class degree in 1908.

From 1909 to 1911, Richards was a lecturer in Political Economy at Glasgow University. He then moved to Bangor University, where he held the chair in Economics until 1922. Richards also wrote a book called Cymru'r Oesau Canol, published during a hiatus from parliament in 1933.

Richards was first elected at the 1922 general election, and was re-elected in 1923. In 1924, he served as Under-Secretary of State for India during the first MacDonald government. At the 1924 general election, he lost the seat to the Liberal Party candidate, Christmas Price Williams. He was re-elected at the 1929 general election, but lost the seat two years later at the 1931 general election to the Liberal Party candidate, Aled Owen Roberts. Richards regained the seat at the 1935 general election and served as Wrexham's MP until he died in office aged seventy in 1954.

At the resulting Wrexham by-election in 1955, Idwal Jones held the seat for Labour.

In 1918, Richards married Mary Myfanwy Owen, the daughter of Thomas Owen. She died in 1950.

References

External links 
 

1884 births
1954 deaths
Academics of Bangor University
Alumni of St John's College, Cambridge
Welsh Labour Party MPs
UK MPs 1922–1923
UK MPs 1923–1924
UK MPs 1929–1931
UK MPs 1935–1945
UK MPs 1945–1950
UK MPs 1950–1951
Welsh socialists
UK MPs 1951–1955
Politics of Wrexham